Eric Lance Lauer (born June 3, 1995) is an American professional baseball pitcher for the Milwaukee Brewers of Major League Baseball (MLB). He played college baseball for the Kent State Golden Flashes of Kent State University. Lauer made his MLB debut with the San Diego Padres in 2018 and was traded to the Brewers before the 2020 season.

Early life
Lauer was born and raised in Elyria, Ohio. He attended Midview High School in Grafton, Ohio, where he played for the schools' baseball team as a pitcher and was a member of the National Honor Society. Lauer took college courses at Lorain County Community College while still in high school. He grew up as a fan of the Cleveland Indians of Major League Baseball (MLB).

Career

Amateur career
At Midview, Lauer played for the baseball team as a pitcher and first baseman. He received attention from MLB scouts as a result of his  fastball. He decided to commit to play college baseball for the University of Kentucky, but he rescinded the decision and committed to Kent State University. As a senior at Midview, Lauer pitched to a 7–0 win–loss record and a 0.15 earned run average (ERA), allowing one earned run in 47 innings pitched, while striking out 96 and allowing 12 hits and eight walks. The Cleveland Plain Dealer named Lauer their player of the year for 2013, and he was named Lorain County's Mr. Baseball.

The Toronto Blue Jays selected Lauer in the 17th round of the 2013 MLB draft. Lauer turned down a signing bonus in excess of $1 million to attend college. Playing for the Kent State Golden Flashes, Lauer had a 5–4 win–loss record, a 1.98 ERA, and 103 strikeouts in 2015, in his sophomore year. During the summer, Lauer pitched for the Orleans Firebirds in the Cape Cod Baseball League and was named a league all-star. He finished his junior year with a 0.69 ERA, the lowest in college baseball since 1979. He won the National Pitcher of the Year Award and Mid-American Conference Baseball Pitcher of the Year Award.

San Diego Padres
The San Diego Padres selected Lauer in the first round, with the 25th overall selection, of the 2016 MLB draft. He signed with the Padres, receiving a $2 million signing bonus. Lauer made his professional debut with the Arizona Padres of the Rookie-level Arizona League, and received promotions to the Tri-City Dust Devils of the Class A-Short Season Northwest League and the Fort Wayne TinCaps of the Class A Midwest League. He finished the 2016 season with a 1–1 record and 2.03 ERA. He also had 37 strikeouts in 31 innings pitched.

Lauer began the 2017 season with the Lake Elsinore Storm of the Class A-Advanced California League. He pitched to a 2–5 record and a 2.79 ERA with 84 strikeouts in  innings, and was promoted to the San Antonio Missions of the Class AA Texas League in July. In 10 games (nine starts) for the Missions, he was 4–3 with 
a 3.93 ERA. Lauer began the 2018 season with the El Paso Chihuahuas of the Class AAA Pacific Coast League.

Lauer was promoted to the major leagues on April 24, 2018. He made his debut the same day, pitching three innings against the Colorado Rockies, yielding six earned runs on six hits and four walks in three innings. He was 6–7 in 23 starts for the Padres with a 4.34 ERA, striking out 100 in 112 innings. He led the major leagues in pickoffs, with 10, while giving up only five stolen bases with two caught stealing.

Milwaukee Brewers
On November 27, 2019, the Padres traded Lauer and Luis Urías to the Milwaukee Brewers in exchange for Trent Grisham, Zach Davies, and cash considerations or a player to be named later. On July 11, 2020, Lauer was placed on the injured list after coming into close contact with somebody who tested positive for COVID-19.
On July 26, 2020, Lauer was activated from the injured list and appeared in his first game against the Chicago Cubs. Lauer played through a shoulder injury in 2020, recording a 13.09 ERA with 12 strikeouts in 11 innings pitched across four games.

On May 26, 2021, Lauer hit his first career home run, a solo shot off of Chris Paddack of the Padres. He had a 3.19 ERA in 20 games started during the 2021 season.

On January 13, 2023, Lauer agreed to a one-year, $5.075 million contract with the Brewers, avoiding salary arbitration.

References

External links

1995 births
Living people
People from Elyria, Ohio
Baseball players from Ohio
All-American college baseball players
Major League Baseball pitchers
San Diego Padres players
Milwaukee Brewers players
Kent State Golden Flashes baseball players
Orleans Firebirds players
Arizona League Padres players
Tri-City Dust Devils players
Fort Wayne TinCaps players
Lake Elsinore Storm players
San Antonio Missions players
El Paso Chihuahuas players
Nashville Sounds players